Platyptilia eberti is a moth of the family Pterophoroidea. It is found on Luzon, Philippines, and was recently discovered in Vietnam, although this record might represent a related undescribed species.

The wingspan is about 17 mm. Adults are on wing in November.

Etymology
The species is called after Mr W. Ebert, one of the collectors.

References

eberti
Endemic fauna of the Philippines
Fauna of Luzon
Moths described in 2003